Beaver Falls, is a waterfall located on Beaver Creek near the town of Clatskanie in Columbia County, in the U.S. state of Oregon.

Description 
The waterfall is formed as Beaver Creek sheets out onto a wide channel over a 40 foot wide chute at high velocity, falling into a natural amphitheater of layered basalt. The waterfall and trail are surrounded by Douglas fir, western red-cedar, western hemlock, and big-leaf maple. Sword fern, Oregon grape, and salal are very common plant life growing beneath the forest canopy.

See also 
 List of waterfalls in Oregon

References 

Waterfalls of Oregon
Parks in Columbia County, Oregon